386ECSS was based at Richmond and deployed on a number of operations including: East Timor; the response to the Bali bombings; Bouganville (Op Bel Isi II); and Iraq (Op Bastille/Falconer/Op Enduring Freedom).
No. 386 ECSS was based at RAAF Richmond, but was disbanded at the end of 2006 and its resources dispersed to other RAAF support units.

386